Laid Rebiga (born 28 December 1973) is the Algerian Minister of War Veterans and Rights Holders. He was appointed as minister on 30 June 2021.

Education 
Rebiga holds a Diploma in Administration from the National School of Administration (ENA).

References 

1973 births
Living people
21st-century Algerian politicians
Algerian politicians
Government ministers of Algeria